The  is a training squadron of the 3rd Tactical Airlift Group of the Japan Air Self-Defense Force (JASDF) based at Miho Air Base in Tottori Prefecture, Japan. It is equipped with 13 T-400 aircraft. The squadron trains JASDF pilots who will go on to fly large jet aircraft like the Kawasaki C-1, Kawasaki C-2, KC-767 and E-767. 

As of 2017 there are plans to move the squadron to Hamamatsu Air Base in Shizuoka Prefecture.

Tail markings

The squadron's aircraft bear a stylized "41" as their tail marking.

Aircraft operated
 T-400 (1994 - )

References

Units of the Japan Air Self-Defense Force